Talat Alp Altunbey (born May 5, 1994) is a Turkish professional basketball player who plays as a power forward for Afyon Belediye of the Turkish Basketball League (BSL).

Professional career
Altunbey was born in Adana. He started playing basketball in Adana Tofaş Çağ Spor Kulübü. He moved to Banvit in 2009. He was loaned to TB2L team Bandırma Kırmızı which is the pilot club of Banvit. He played first TBL season in 2011–2012, with Bandırma Kırmızı. In 2013, he moved to Banvit first team but he continued to playing with Bandırma Kırmızı until 2014 via dual licence.

External links
Talat Alp Altunbey Banvit Profile
Talat Altunbey TBLStat.net Profile
Talat Alp Altunbey Eurobasket Profile

1994 births
Living people
Afyonkarahisar Belediyespor players
Bandırma B.İ.K. players
People from Adana
Turkish men's basketball players
Power forwards (basketball)